The Wilson Creek Range is a mountain range in Lincoln County, Nevada.

The range has the name of Charles Wilson, a local county commissioner.

References 

Mountain ranges of Lincoln County, Nevada
Mountain ranges of Nevada